Benton Township is one of eleven townships in Atchison County, Missouri, United States. As of the 2010 census, its population was 23.

Benton Township was established in 1858, and named after Thomas Hart Benton, a Missouri senator.

Geography

The stream of State Line Slough (Missouri) runs through this township.

References

 USGS Geographic Names Information System (GNIS)

External links
 US-Counties.com
 City-Data.com

Townships in Atchison County, Missouri
Townships in Missouri